At the Bar  is a 2007 Turkish crime drama film, written and directed by Serdar Akar based on a real-life event that happened in Ankara, Turkey in 1997, featuring Nejat İşler as the head of a gang which brutalises, murders and rapes a group of young friends.

Plot
A group of young high society friends, aged between 18 and 25, are gathered at a friend's bar that they regularly frequent for the night. But when they finish of their last beer and prepare to head home they find themselves held captive at gunpoint by five strangers. With their mouths, hands and feet tied, they are tortured, raped and murdered until the next morning. The gang who have captured them have no clear reason, they just want to punish these young people for everything left incomplete in their lives.

Cast
Nejat İşler – Egzozcu Selim
Hakan Boyav – Patlak Osman
Serdar Orçin – 45
Erdal Beşikçioğlu – Nasır
Volga Sorgu – Çırak
Doğu Alpan – Nail
Burak Altay – TGG
Melis Birkan – Nil
Nergis Öztürk – evgi
Sezen Aray – Pelin
Meltem Parlak – Aynur
Şamil Kafkas – Aliş
Salih Bademci – Cenk
Sarp Aydınoğlu – Barbo
Eray Özbal – Savcı

Festival Screenings
14th Antalya Golden Boll Film Festival
18th Limak Ankara International Film Festival
26th Istanbul International Film Festival

References

External links

2007 films
2000s Turkish-language films
Films set in Turkey
Films set in Istanbul
Turkish crime drama films
2007 thriller drama films
2007 crime drama films
2007 crime thriller films